Eamon John "Ted" Lindsay (born 19 December 1942) is a former Australian politician. Born in Tully, Queensland, he was a solicitor and a City of Townsville Councillor before entering federal politics. In 1983, he was elected to the Australian House of Representatives as the Labor member for Herbert, defeating the sitting Liberal member, Gordon Dean. On 24 March 1993 he was appointed Parliamentary Secretary to the Minister for Industry, Technology and Regional Development; on 25 March 1994 this portfolio was renamed Parliamentary Secretary to the Minister for Industry, Science and Technology. Lindsay was defeated in the 1996 election by Liberal candidate Peter Lindsay; the two are not related.

References

Australian Labor Party members of the Parliament of Australia
Members of the Australian House of Representatives for Herbert
Members of the Australian House of Representatives
1942 births
Living people
People from Townsville
20th-century Australian politicians